In physics, Wick rotation, named after Italian physicist Gian Carlo Wick, is a method of finding a solution to a mathematical problem in Minkowski space from a solution to a related problem in Euclidean space by means of a transformation that substitutes an imaginary-number variable for a real-number variable. This transformation is also used to find solutions to problems in quantum mechanics and other areas.

Overview
Wick rotation is motivated by the observation that the Minkowski metric in natural units (with metric signature  convention)

and the four-dimensional Euclidean metric

are equivalent if one permits the coordinate  to take on imaginary values. The Minkowski metric becomes Euclidean when  is restricted to the imaginary axis, and vice versa. Taking a problem expressed in Minkowski space with coordinates , and substituting 
sometimes yields a problem in real Euclidean coordinates  which is easier to solve. This solution may then, under reverse substitution, yield a solution to the original problem.

Statistical and quantum mechanics
Wick rotation connects statistical mechanics to quantum mechanics by replacing inverse temperature  with imaginary time . Consider a large collection of harmonic oscillators at temperature . The average value of an observable  is, up to a normalizing constant,

 

Now consider a single quantum harmonic oscillator in a superposition of basis states, evolving for a time  under a Hamiltonian . The relative phase change of the basis state with energy  is  where  is reduced Planck's constant. 
The probability amplitude that a uniform (equally weighted) superposition of states

 

evolves to an arbitrary superposition

 

is, up to a normalizing constant,

Statics and dynamics

Wick rotation relates statics problems in  dimensions to dynamics problems in  dimensions, trading one dimension of space for one dimension of time. A simple example where  is a hanging spring with fixed endpoints in a gravitational field. The shape of the spring is a curve . The spring is in equilibrium when the energy associated with this curve is at a critical point (an extremum); this critical point is typically a minimum, so this idea is usually called "the principle of least energy". To compute the energy, we integrate the energy spatial density over space:

 

The corresponding dynamics problem is that of a rock thrown upwards. The path the rock follows is that which extremalizes the action; as before, this extremum is typically a minimum, so this is called the "principle of least action". Action is the time integral of the Lagrangian:

 

Both thermal/quantum and static/dynamic
Taken together, the previous two examples show how the path integral formulation of quantum mechanics is related to statistical mechanics. From statistical mechanics, the shape of each spring in a collection at temperature  will deviate from the least-energy shape due to thermal fluctuations; the probability of finding a spring with a given shape decreases exponentially with the energy difference from the least-energy shape. Similarly, a quantum particle moving in a potential can be described by a superposition of paths, each with a phase : the thermal variations in the shape across the collection have turned into quantum uncertainty in the path of the quantum particle.

Further details
The Schrödinger equation and the heat equation are also related by Wick rotation. However, there is a slight difference. Statistical-mechanical -point functions satisfy positivity, whereas Wick-rotated quantum field theories satisfy reflection positivity.

Wick rotation also relates a quantum field theory at a finite inverse temperature  to a statistical-mechanical model over the "tube"  with the imaginary time coordinate  being periodic with period .

Note, however, that the Wick rotation cannot be viewed as a rotation on a complex vector space that is equipped with the conventional norm and metric induced by the inner product, as in this case the rotation would cancel out and have no effect.

Interpretation and rigorous proof 
Wick rotations can be seen as a useful trick that works due to the similarity between the equations of two seemingly distinct fields of physics. Quantum Field Theory in a Nutshell by Anthony Zee discusses Wick rotations, saying that

It has been proven that a more rigorous link between Euclidean and quantum field theory can be constructed using the Osterwalder–Schrader theorem.

See also
 Complex spacetime
 Imaginary time
 Schwinger function

References

External links

 A Spring in Imaginary Time — a worksheet in Lagrangian mechanics illustrating how replacing length by imaginary time turns the parabola of a hanging spring into the inverted parabola of a thrown particle
 Euclidean Gravity — a short note by Ray Streater on the "Euclidean Gravity" programme.

Quantum field theory
Statistical mechanics